Statistics of American Soccer League in season 1925–26.

Overview
In June 1925, the league admitted the Shawsheen Indians, winners of the 1924–25 National Challenge Cup.  The team was owned by William Madison Wood who also owned the American Woolen Company.  The team began on a high note, goings 10-4-1 through its first fifteen games.  However, in mid-December it experienced a reversal of form, going 1-10-2.  When Wood died in February, the team withdrew from the league and disbanded.

Beginning on September 12, 1925, the American Soccer League began a forty-four game schedule which ended on May 31, 1926.  The league introduced an innovation this season.  Previously winners were selected on cumulative points.  With many teams not completing all their scheduled games, the league adopted an approach similar to professional baseball which used a win percentage to determine its champions.  However, rather than calculating a win-lose percentage, the American Soccer League calculated the percentage of points won versus the number of points available.

League standings

Lewis Cup
The American Soccer League ran its second league cup during the season.  The winners were awarded the H.E. Lewis Cup.

Bracket

Final

New Bedford wins Lewis Cup, 5–4, on aggregate.

Goals leaders

References

External links
The Year in American Soccer - 1926

American Soccer League (1921–1933) seasons
Amer